Edinburgh Agreement may refer to:
Edinburgh Agreement (1992), an agreement reached at a European Council meeting in Edinburgh that granted Denmark four exceptions to the Maastricht Treaty
Edinburgh Agreement (2012), an agreement between the Scottish Government and the UK Government over the terms of the 2014 referendum on Scottish independence

See also
Edinburgh Declaration, a 1987 declaration by the Commonwealth of Nations regarding its membership criteria